The women's water polo tournament at the 2008 Summer Olympics in Beijing was held from 11 August to 21 August at the Ying Tung Natatorium.

Teams from eight nations competed, seeded into two groups for the preliminary round. 20 games were played, 12 of them in the preliminary round (each team played the other teams in the group). Eight games were played in the final round.

Format

The tournament featured eight teams, separated into two groups of four teams. Each team played the other three teams in its pool once in a round-robin format. The first-place team in each pool qualified directly for the semifinal, the second- and third-place teams moved on to the quarterfinal round, and the fourth-place teams played each other in a seventh place game.

The winners of the quarterfinal games moved on to the semifinals to face the top teams from each pool, while the quarterfinal losers played a fifth place classification game. The semifinal winners played in the gold medal game, while the losers played each other for the bronze.

Preliminary round
All times are CST (UTC+8).

Group A

Group B

Final rounds
Bracket

7th place match
All times are CST (UTC+8).

Quarterfinals
All times are CST (UTC+8).

5th place match
All times are CST (UTC+8).

Semifinals
All times are CST (UTC+8).

Bronze medal match
All times are CST (UTC+8).

Gold medal match
All times are CST (UTC+8).

Ranking and statistics

Final ranking

Multi-time Olympians

Three-time Olympian(s): 4 players
 : Sofia Konukh, Elena Smurova
 : Heather Petri, Brenda Villa

Multiple medalists

Three-time Olympic medalist(s): 2 players
 : Heather Petri, Brenda Villa

Top goalscorers

Medallists

Awards
Media All-Star Team
 Goalkeeper
  Patrícia Horváth (43 saves)
 Field players
  Daniëlle de Bruijn (left-handed, 17 goals, 15 sprints won)
  Elisa Casanova (left-handed, 7 goals)
  Gao Ao (11 goals)
  Bronwen Knox (12 goals)
  Jessica Steffens (5 goals)
  Ágnes Valkai (7 goals, 10 sprints won)

See also

 Water polo at the 2008 Summer Olympics – Men's tournament

References

Sources
 PDF documents in the LA84 Foundation Digital Library:
 Official Results Book – 2008 Olympic Games – Water Polo (download, archive)
 Water polo on the Olympedia website
 Water polo at the 2008 Summer Olympics (women's tournament)
 Water polo on the Sports Reference website
 Water polo at the 2008 Summer Games (women's tournament) (archived)

External links
 Beijing 2008 Summer Olympics

Women's tournament
2008 in women's water polo
Women's events at the 2008 Summer Olympics